Restorative Yoga is the practice of asanas, each held for longer than in conventional yoga as exercise classes, often with the support of props such as folded blankets, to relax the body, reduce stress, and often to prepare for pranayama.

Practice

Restorative Yoga sessions allow the body to slow down and relax in a small number of asanas. Each pose is held for longer than in conventional classes, sometimes for twenty minutes, so a session may consist of only four to six asanas. The long holding of poses is often assisted with props such as folded blankets, blocks, and bolsters to ensure the body is fully supported and so to allow the muscles to relax. 

An early disciple of B.K.S. Iyengar, the yoga teacher and Yoga Journal editor Judith Lasater helped to popularize restorative yoga, based on Iyengar Yoga's asanas and use of props. For home practice, she suggests substituting throw pillows, couch cushions, or large bags of rice or dry beans as improvised props.

Lasater proposes twelve asanas and their variants, for a total of twenty poses, with detailed instructions that occupy much of her 2017 book Restore and Rebalance. The poses are reclining or supported variants of Baddha Konasana, Balasana (child's pose), Uttanasana, Downward Dog, Prasarita Padottanasana (wide-legged forward bend), Urdhva Dhanurasana (upward bow), Setu Bandhasana (bridge), legs up the wall, Sarvangasana (shoulderstand), Halasana (plough), Urdhva Paschimottanasana (upward-facing forward bend), and Shavasana.

The yoga teacher Cyndi Lee suggests a short sequence of six asanas, all with the use of supports: reclining bound angle pose (Supta Baddha Konasana), legs up the wall (Viparita Karani), a prone twist with both knees to one side (Jathara Parivartanasana), a sitting forward bend (Paschimottanasana), child's pose (Balasana), and corpse pose (Shavasana, with or without supports). 

Lee links the need for Restorative Yoga to the stress of modern life and the resulting habitual state of fight-or-flight, appropriate to emergencies but harmful when chronic. The biological response involves the hormone adrenaline signalling emergency, raising blood pressure, heart rate, and muscle tension, while resources are diverted from the digestive and reproductive systems, and from processes of cell growth and tissue repair; Restorative Yoga can in her view help to reverse that process. Lee describes yoga relaxation as combining the active quality of standing to attention in Tadasana with the passive quality of lying down like a corpse in Shavasana. The combination offers in her view a middle path, receptiveness.

Restorative Yoga  

The goal of Restorative Yoga is to bring about physical, mental, and spiritual equilibrium. To help maintain a variety of yoga poses for longer lengths of time, props like blankets, bolsters, and blocks are used. As a result, the mind and body are able to completely unwind and recover from mental and emotional strain. Self-care, healing, and relaxation are all possible outcomes of practising Restorative Yoga. It's a great strategy as this yoga for stress relief improves your health and helps in lowering stress levels. For more..

Reception

Geraldine Beirne, writing in The Guardian, called Restorative Yoga "all about healing the mind and body through simple poses often held for as long as 20 minutes, with the help of props such as bolsters, pillows and straps". 

The martial arts coach Eric C. Stevens, stating that he found being still more difficult than a "five mile run", was surprised to start the Restorative Yoga class with Shavasana, and to see so many props in use - blanket, pillow, eye bag, strap, blocks. He found his mind strongly challenged during the class, and he slept very soundly afterwards. He recommended the practice for people who feel close to burnout.

Difference from Yin Yoga

Restorative Yoga is mainly for practitioners suffering from injuries, stress, or illness, who therefore require a yoga practice that can bring them back to a better quality of life; classes are necessarily small so that each person can receive detailed attention to ensure they are safe and properly supported. Yin Yoga uses props in a similar way, and holds poses for similarly long periods, but is aimed mainly at healthy practitioners, and is taught in larger classes.

Claimed benefits 

Claimed benefits, according to Jillian Pransky in Yoga Journal, include the skill of conscious relaxation through long-held, supported resting poses; discovering where tension is being held in the body, allowing focus on the breath; triggering the relaxation response, in which the body leaves its "fight or flight" and begins to experience the opposite, recuperative mode; and practising the ability to look inward, by stopping the focus of "doing" and instead practising "being."

See also

 Yoga as therapy

References

Sources

Further reading

External links
 Yoga International: Restorative Yoga without 'tons of props'

Yoga styles
Yoga as therapy